Barastre is a commune in the Pas-de-Calais department in the Hauts-de-France region in northern France.

Geography
A farming village located 19 miles (30 km) southeast of Arras on the D20 road.  The entire commune was destroyed during World War I.

History
During World War I, the village was occupied by British troops in March 1917, before being lost a year later to the Germans. The village was retaken on September 5 following an advance by the 42nd British division (East Lancashire). Nearly 10 British soldiers are buried in this cemetery (one of whom was buried by the Germans in 1916). In the cemetery extension are the graves of 284 German soldiers, 46 French, 39 British, four New Zealanders and one Australian.
The commune was awarded the Croix de Guerre in 1920.

Population

Sights
 The ruins of an early castle.
 The church of St. Martin, dating from the twentieth century.
 The war memorial.

See also
Communes of the Pas-de-Calais department

References

External links

 The CWGC cemetery

Communes of Pas-de-Calais